Damien Patrick Hardwick (born 18 August 1972) is an Australian rules football coach and former player. He is the senior coach of the Richmond Football Club in the Australian Football League (AFL) since 2010, and has the longest continuous service of any current AFL coach.

His playing career as a defender comprised 153 games for Essendon (1994–2001) and 54 games for Port Adelaide (2002–2004). He won premierships with each club, in 2000 and 2004 respectively.

Hardwick was appointed head coach of Richmond at the end of the 2009 season, in which the club had placed second-last. Richmond returned to the finals in 2013, Hardwick's fourth season in charge, and in 2017 defeated Adelaide in the grand final to claim their first premiership since 1980. Hardwick coached Richmond to the 2017, 2019 and 2020 premierships and is the longest tenured coach in Richmond club history.

Early life
He attended St Joseph's College in Ferntree Gully. Hardwick was a key player in the school's football side, which was highly competitive against other private schools in the EIS sports program. In football, Hardwick was usually on the field for most of the game and known to be a tough, hard working, and versatile player who kept stability in play for his side. Although he was often outclassed by others on field, his all round abilities were vital to the side.

AFL playing career

Essendon
Beginning his AFL career with the Essendon Football Club in 1994, Hardwick was known as a tough, solid defender. His aggressive nature sometimes got him into trouble at the AFL Tribunal. He was a crucial part of Essendon's 2000 premiership side.

Port Adelaide
He was traded from Essendon to the Port Adelaide Football Club at the end of the 2001 season,
and played with the side from 2002 until his retirement at the end of the 2004 season. He was part of Port's premiership win in 2004. In the 2004 Grand Final he won three free kicks at crucial times, including a reversal against Jason Akermanis which cost the Brisbane Lions a shot at goal.

AFL coaching career

Hawthorn Football Club assistant coach
In 2005, Hardwick began working as an assistant coach under senior coach Alastair Clarkson at Hawthorn.

In 2007, Hardwick was shortlisted for the senior coaching job at Melbourne Football Club, however he was unsuccessful, with the position going to Dean Bailey. Following this application he was also shortlisted for the senior coaching job at Essendon Football Club to replace the outgoing Kevin Sheedy however he was overlooked in favour of former Richmond captain Matthew Knights.

Richmond Football Club
On August 25, 2009, Hardwick received his first senior coaching job when he was appointed as the senior coach of Richmond Football Club for three years. Hardwick replaced Richmond Football Club caretaker senior coach Jade Rawlings, who replaced Terry Wallace, after Wallace resigned during the middle of the 2009 season, when the Tigers were struggling. In March 2012, Hardwick agreed to a two-year contract extension. On 11 December 2013, club president, Peggy O'Neal, announced that Hardwick had accepted a two-year contract extension that tied him to the club at least until the end of the 2016 season. In 2016, Hardwick agreed to a two-year contract extension to the end of the 2018 season. In 2017, Hardwick coached Richmond to their first premiership since 1980 and their 11th overall with a 48-point victory over the Adelaide Crows. In 2019, Hardwick coached Richmond to another premiership and their 12th overall. Richmond beat GWS Giants by 89 points. In 2020, Hardwick coached Richmond to their third premiership in four years, and 13th overall. He also coached the Victoria State of Origin side in the one-off 2020 State of Origin match that was played on 28 February 2020 at Marvel Stadium.

Hardwick's first season at Richmond as senior coach in the 2010 season did not begin well, with nine straight losses to start the season as well as a few disciplinary issues arising at the club. However, in round 10 the Tigers had a breakthrough win; defeating Port Adelaide by 47 points in extremely wet conditions in Adelaide. They also set a new record for the most tackles ever made in an AFL match (142) since records began in 1987, and kept Port Adelaide to their lowest ever score. The club went on to win five more games making a total of six in Hardwick's first season. They finished the season in 15th position. Richmond under Hardwick over the next 2 seasons continue to show improvement winning 8 games and a draw in the 2011 season, improving that to 10 wins and a draw in the 2012 season. In the 2013 season, Hardwick coached Richmond to its first finals series since 2001, and only its third since 1982.  defeated Richmond by 20 points in the elimination final after the Tigers led by 26 points at half-time, eliminating Richmond from the finals series. In the 2014 season, Hardwick's team started the year very poorly, having a win–loss record of 3–10 at one stage. But remarkably, the Tigers went on to win their last nine matches of the home and away season to just make it into the finals. Richmond were however beaten convincingly by Port Adelaide by 57 points in the Elimination Final, finishing the season in eighth place.

Hardwick began the 2015 season under pressure to make amends for their past two failed Elimination Finals. It didn't start well, losing 4 out of the first 6 before recovering to finish the season in 5th place with 15 wins, same ladder position and win–loss record as 2013. Richmond came up against North Melbourne in the Elimination Final, but once again failed and Hardwick's team suffered their third consecutive first week finals exit. The 2016 season was not a successful year for Hardwick as the Tigers finished the season with just 8 wins from 22 games. The highlight was the round 8 win against the Sydney Swans when Sam Lloyd kicked a goal after the siren. They finished 13th on the premiership ladder, their worst ladder position in four seasons.

In the 2017 season, Hardwick coached Richmond to their eleventh VFL/AFL premiership, defeating the Adelaide Crows by 48 points. After becoming the first coach in 37 years to guide  to a Grand Final win in the 2017 AFL Grand Final, Hardwick was chosen as the AFLCA Coach of the Year. He joined a very small group to win three AFL premierships with three clubs as player and coach, ending Richmond's 37 Year drought in the process.

In the 2018 season, Hardwick followed up his successful 2017 season by coaching Richmond to their first minor premiership since 1982 and to the finals. Richmond were however eliminated by eventual runners-up Collingwood by 39 points in the Preliminary Final.

In the 2019 season, Hardwick became a two-time premiership coach, guiding Richmond to their second premiership in three years and twelfth overall with a resounding 89 point win over GWS Giants in the 2019 AFL Grand Final. It was the third-highest margin of victory in a Grand Final.

In the 2020 season, which was significantly affected by the Covid-19 pandemic in Australia, Hardwick coached Richmond to their third premiership in four years and became a three-time premiership coach. Richmond finished third on the ladder at the end of the home-and-away season (with a record of 12 wins, 4 losses, and 1 draw). They lost to the Brisbane Lions (10.9.69 to 8.6.54) in their qualifying final, defeated the St Kilda Saints (12.8.80 to 6.13.49) in their semi-final, and defeated Port Adelaide (6.10.46 to 6.4.40) in their preliminary final. They defeated the Geelong Cats by 31 points (12.9.81 to 7.8.50) in the Grand Final at The Gabba – the first Grand Final to be played outside Victoria and the first night-time Grand Final. Hardwick was heavily featured in the Prime Video web-series Making Their Mark which documented the 2020 AFL season.

Despite aiming to become the seventh team to win three consecutive premierships, the 2021 season was not a successful year for Hardwick as the Tigers finished the season with just 9 wins from 22 games. With a combination of multiple injured players and a lack of consistent form, Richmond finished 12th on the premiership ladder, their worst ladder position since 2016 and failed to make finals for the first time in five years.

Statistics

Playing statistics

|-
|- style="background-color: #EAEAEA"
! scope="row" style="text-align:center" | 1994
|style="text-align:center;"|
| 39 || 17 || 6 || 4 || 176 || 107 || 283 || 62 || 29 || 0.4 || 0.2 || 10.4 || 6.3 || 16.6 || 3.6 || 1.7
|-
! scope="row" style="text-align:center" | 1995
|style="text-align:center;"|
| 39 || 16 || 2 || 1 || 123 || 97 || 220 || 38 || 31 || 0.1 || 0.1 || 7.7 || 6.1 || 13.8 || 2.4 || 1.9
|- style="background-color: #EAEAEA"
! scope="row" style="text-align:center" | 1996
|style="text-align:center;"|
| 39 || 17 || 1 || 1 || 170 || 102 || 272 || 60 || 22 || 0.1 || 0.1 || 10.0 || 6.0 || 16.0 || 3.5 || 1.3
|-
! scope="row" style="text-align:center" | 1997
|style="text-align:center;"|
| 39 || 15 || 3 || 2 || 177 || 87 || 264 || 55 || 26 || 0.2 || 0.1 || 11.8 || 5.8 || 17.6 || 3.7 || 1.7
|- style="background-color: #EAEAEA"
! scope="row" style="text-align:center" | 1998
|style="text-align:center;"|
| 11 || 23 || 0 || 1 || 325 || 117 || 442 || 87 || 43 || 0.0 || 0.0 || 14.1 || 5.1 || 19.2 || 3.8 || 1.9
|-
! scope="row" style="text-align:center" | 1999
|style="text-align:center;"|
| 11 || 20 || 0 || 0 || 246 || 108 || 354 || 51 || 32 || 0.0 || 0.0 || 12.3 || 5.4 || 17.7 || 2.6 || 1.6
|- style="background-color: #EAEAEA"
! scope="row" style="text-align:center" | 2000
|style="text-align:center;"|
| 11 || 24 || 0 || 1 || 270 || 172 || 442 || 71 || 55 || 0.0 || 0.0 || 11.3 || 7.2 || 18.4 || 3.0 || 2.3
|-
! scope="row" style="text-align:center" | 2001
|style="text-align:center;"|
| 11 || 21 || 1 || 0 || 203 || 155 || 358 || 72 || 41 || 0.0 || 0.0 || 9.7 || 7.4 || 17.0 || 3.4 || 2.0
|- style="background-color: #EAEAEA"
! scope="row" style="text-align:center" | 2002
|style="text-align:center;"|
| 11 || 20 || 0 || 1 || 182 || 121 || 303 || 58 || 50 || 0.0 || 0.1 || 9.1 || 6.1 || 15.2 || 2.9 || 2.5
|-
! scope="row" style="text-align:center" | 2003
|style="text-align:center;"|
| 11 || 20 || 0 || 2 || 154 || 111 || 265 || 57 || 42 || 0.0 || 0.1 || 7.7 || 5.6 || 13.3 || 2.9 || 2.1
|- style="background-color: #EAEAEA"
! scope="row" style="text-align:center" | 2004
|style="text-align:center;"|
| 11 || 14 || 1 || 0 || 80 || 86 || 166 || 34 || 27 || 0.1 || 0.0 || 5.7 || 6.1 || 11.9 || 2.4 || 1.9
|- class="sortbottom"
! colspan=3| Career
! 207
! 14
! 13
! 2106
! 1263
! 3369
! 645
! 398
! 0.1
! 0.1
! 10.2
! 6.1
! 16.3
! 3.1
! 1.9
|}

Coaching statistics
Statistics are correct to the end of the 2020 season

|- style="background-color: #EAEAEA"
! scope="row" style="font-weight:normal"|2010
|
| 22 || 6 || 16 || 0 || 27.3% || 15 || 16
|-
! scope="row" style="font-weight:normal"|2011
|
| 22 || 8 || 13 || 1 || 38.6% || 12 || 17
|- style="background-color: #EAEAEA"
! scope="row" style="font-weight:normal"|2012
|
| 22 || 10 || 11 || 1 || 47.7% || 12 || 18
|-
! scope="row" style="font-weight:normal"|2013
|
| 23 || 15 || 8 || 0 || 65.2% || 5 || 18
|- style="background-color: #EAEAEA"
! scope="row" style="font-weight:normal"|2014
|
| 23 || 12 || 11 || 0 || 52.2% || 8 || 18
|-
! scope="row" style="font-weight:normal"|2015
|
| 23 || 15 || 8 || 0 || 65.2% || 5 || 18
|- style="background-color: #EAEAEA"
! scope="row" style="font-weight:normal"|2016
|
| 22 || 8 || 14 || 0 || 36.4% || 13 || 18
|-
! scope="row" style="font-weight:normal"|2017
|
| 25 || 18 || 7 || 0 || 72.0% || 3 || 18
|-
! scope="row" style="font-weight:normal"|2018
| 
| 24 || 19 || 5 || 0 || 79.2% || 1 || 18
|-
! scope="row" style="font-weight:normal"|2019
| 
| 25 || 19 || 6 || 0 || 76.0% || 3 || 18
|-
! scope="row" style="font-weight:normal"|2020
| 
| 21 || 15 || 5 || 1 || 73.8% || 3 || 18
|- class="sortbottom"
! colspan=2| Career totals
! 252
! 145
! 104
! 3
! 58.1%
! colspan=2|
|}

Honours and achievements
North Melbourne Under-19s premiership player: 1990, 1991
Essendon best and fairest 1998
Essendon premiership player 2000
All-Australian 2000
International rules series: 2000, 2001
Port Adelaide premiership player 2004
Hawthorn premiership assistant coach 2008
 premiership coach: 2017, 2019, 2020
Jock McHale Medal: 2017, 2019, 2020
AFLCA Coach of the Year 2017

References

External links

 

1972 births
Living people
Essendon Football Club players
Essendon Football Club Premiership players
Richmond Football Club coaches
Richmond Football Club Premiership coaches
Port Adelaide Football Club players
Port Adelaide Football Club Premiership players
Port Adelaide Football Club players (all competitions)
All-Australians (AFL)
Crichton Medal winners
Australian rules footballers from Victoria (Australia)
Australia international rules football team players
All-Australian coaches
Two-time VFL/AFL Premiership players
Three-time VFL/AFL Premiership coaches